Nereo may refer to:
An alternative name of the Greek deity Nereus
Nereo Cave, a huge underwater sea-cave in the Coral riviera of Alghero, Italy
Nereo Bolzon (born 1960), Canadian football player
Nereo Champagne (born 1985), Argentine football goalkeeper
Nereo Fernández (born 1979), Argentine footballer
Nereo Laroni (1942–2019), Italian politician
Nereo Rocco (1912–1979), Italian football player and manager

See also
Nereocystis, a genus of kelp
Nereus (disambiguation)